The Nestorian Cross is associated with the Church of the East. It is composed of a cross similar to the Maltese cross, with four arms of roughly equal length which narrow in width towards the center of the cross. In Eastern Christian art in China, these crosses are sometimes simplified and depicted as resting on a lotus flower or on a stylized cloud.

Cross of the Assyrian Church of the East
The cross of the Assyrian Church of the East has three dots lining the left cross-bar, three dots lining the right cross-bar, two dots lining the top bar, and one dot on the bottom bar. These nine dots represent the nine orders of ministry within the church. Between the two dots on the top bar is a crown with three prongs, representing the Trinity.

Gallery

References

External links 

 Mark W. Brown Nestorian Cross Collection (Drew University): Overview Images
 Image: a gilt copper Nestorian plaque dated back to T‘ang dynasty
 http://www.usfca.edu/ricci/events/lotusandcross/index.htm

Nestorianism
Cross symbols
Church of the East